This list of Thai film directors is incomplete. Please help by adding to it. It is customary for Thais to be grouped by their given name, not their family name, even if they have taken a Western name.

A
Aditya Assarat
Anocha Suwichakornpong
Apichatpong Weerasethakul
Areeya Sirisopha

B
Banjong Pisonthanakun
Bhandit Rittakol

C
Chatrichalerm Yukol
Cherd Songsri
Chukiat Sakweerakul

E
Ekachai Uekorngtham
Euthana Mukdasanit

H
Haeman Chatemee

J
Jira Maligool

K
Kongdej Jaturanrasamee
Kittikorn Liasirikun
Kongkiat Khomsiri

M
Michael Shaowanasai
Mingmongkol Sonakul
Mitr Chaibancha
Monthon Arayangkoon

N
Nontawat Numbenchapol
Nonzee Nimibutr
Nithiwat Tharathorn

P
Pakphum Wonjinda
Pang Brothers
Panna Rittikrai
Parkpoom Wongpoom
Payut Ngaokrachang
Pen-Ek Ratanaruang
Petchtai Wongkamlao
Pimpaka Towira
Pisut Praesangeam
Poj Arnon
Prachya Pinkaew

R
Rattana Pestonji

S
Sompote Sands
Somtow Sucharitkul
Songyos Sugmakanan
Suthep Po-ngam

T
Thanit Jitnukul
Thunska Pansittivorakul

V
Vichit Kounavudhi

W
Wisit Sasanatieng
Wych Kaosayananda

Y
Youngyooth Thongkonthun
Yuthlert Sippapak

 
Film directors
Thai